Yonnhy Pérez (born 18 January 1979) is a Colombian former professional boxer who competed from 2005 to 2011. He held the IBF bantamweight title from 2009 to 2010, reaching a peak ranking of number three at bantamweight by The Ring magazine in December 2010.

Professional career
Although born in Colombia, Pérez has fought all but one of his professional fights in the United States. He made his debut on 30 July 2005 in Tucson, Arizona at the age of 26. Pérez made a winning start to his career, knocking out Steve Lozoya in the first round.

Pérez faced his biggest challenge on 29 May 2009, when he travelled to Johannesburg, South Africa to fight Silence Mabuza in an IBF Bantamweight title eliminator. Mabuza, a native of Johannesburg, was a former world champion and had only lost to the renowned Mexican Rafael Marquez. Despite trailing on all three scorecards, Pérez was able to knock Mabuza out in the final round.

IBF bantamweight champion
In his first world title fight Pérez successfully challenged the IBF champion, Joseph Agbeko from Ghana. Agbeko, who in his previous fight defeated Vic Darchinyan, suffered a knockdown (a result of an unintentional headbutt) in the tenth round en route to losing his title to Pérez via a unanimous decision.

On 22 May 2010, Pérez, defending his IBF title for the first time, fought to a majority draw against the unbeaten Mexican Abner Mares. One judge scored the bout 115–113 in favor of Mares while the other two scored it 114–114 even, resulting in Pérez retaining his title. After the fight both boxers claimed that the decision should have gone their way, and both expressed interest in a rematch.

Perez vs. Agbeko II

Rather than an immediate rematch with Mares, Pérez faced Agbeko for a second time in the first round of Showtime's bantamweight tournament, while Mares faced Darchinyan on 11 December. Pérez went on to lose a unanimous decision to Agbeko in the match, and a technical decision (on accidental cuts) to Darchinyan on 23 April 2011. In March 2012, having not fought since the losses to Agbeko and Darchinyan, Pérez announced his retirement from boxing, citing a lack of motivation to continue in the sport.

Professional boxing record

References

External links

World bantamweight boxing champions
1979 births
Living people
International Boxing Federation champions
Colombian male boxers
Sportspeople from Cartagena, Colombia
Pan American Games medalists in boxing
Pan American Games bronze medalists for Colombia
Boxers at the 2003 Pan American Games
Medalists at the 2003 Pan American Games